Kisumu Town West is an electoral constituency in Kenya. It is one of seven constituencies of Kisumu County. The constituency was established for the 1997 elections, when the larger Kisumu Town Constituency was split into Kisumu Town East and West Constituencies. The constituency has eleven wards, all electing councillors for Kisumu municipality.

Members of Parliament

Wards

References 

Constituencies in Kisumu County
Constituencies in Nyanza Province
1997 establishments in Kenya
Constituencies established in 1997